Villaescusa is a Spanish municipality in the province of Zamora, Castile and León. It has a population of 352 (2004) and an area of 43,12 km².

This article contains information from the Spanish Wikipedia article Villaescusa (Zamora), accessed on January 8, 2008.

References

Municipalities of the Province of Zamora